Margrét Jóhannsdóttir (born 10 January 1995) is an Icelandic badminton player.

Achievements

BWF International Challenge/Series (1 title, 2 runners-up) 
Women's doubles

Mixed doubles

  BWF International Challenge tournament
  BWF International Series tournament
  BWF Future Series tournament

References

External links 
 

1995 births
Living people
Margret Johannsdottir